Macías (also spelled Macias) is a Spanish surname found to varying degrees in Europe and Latin America. The first Equatoguinean President had that surname and was sometimes mononymously called Macías. Within Spain, its frequency is highest in Extremadura, followed by Andalusia, the Canary Islands and Castile and León.  In Mexico, there are concentrations in Los Altos de Jalisco, Tamaulipas, and along the Texas-Mexico border.

There is no singular theory as to the origin of Macías. A long-standing argument over its origin revolves around whether or not it is of a Sephardi origin. Some argue that Macías originates from the Spanish version of the Hebraic term for the Messiah, while others hold that Macías (pronounced  in some areas in Spain) actually is the Spanish version of the Biblical name, Matias or Matthew. Given that the Sephardim used surnames that were in many cases identical to those of their Gentile neighbors, it can be reasoned that certain Macías members were Sephardi without the surname Macias being exclusively Sephardi.

According to John Woodward (with reference to the heraldic coat of arms): "Dice, Cards, and other Instruments of Amusement.--Gules, three dice in perspective argent, marked  (for six in front, three on the sinister side, two on the top) sable, is the coat of Mathias in England; of a family of the same name in France, and of Quintana in Spain. For the former families the allusion is clear to the 'lot' cast by which St. Matthias was chosen to the office of the Apostolate. Macías, in Spain, similarly bears: Gules, six dice (two, two, and two) all marked for sixes sabel (Piferrer, Nobiliario de España, vol. ii., No. 1113)."

Geographical distribution
As of 2014, 43.8% of all known bearers of the surname Macías were residents of Mexico (frequency 1:703), 17.1% of Ecuador (1:230), 13.2% of the United States (1:6,772), 8.8% of Spain (1:1,314), 6.3% of Colombia (1:1,873), 2.3% of Cuba (1:1,229), 1.8% of Argentina (1:5,917) and 1.8% of Venezuela (1:4,269).

In Spain, the frequency of the surname was higher than national average (1:1,314) in the following regions:
 1. Extremadura (1:346)
 2. Andalusia (1:575)
 3. Canary Islands (1:882)
 4. Castile and León (1:1,309)

In Ecuador, the frequency of the surname was higher than national average (1:230) in the following provinces:
 1. Manabí (1:52)
 2. Los Ríos (1:105)
 3. Guayas (1:179)
 4. Santo Domingo de los Tsáchilas (1:184)
 5. Esmeraldas (1:214)

In Mexico, the frequency of the surname was higher than national average (1:703) in the following states:
 1. Aguascalientes (1:73)
 2. Zacatecas (1:204)
 3. Jalisco (1:231)
 4. Colima (1:305)
 5. Coahuila (1:358)
 6. Durango (1:373)
 7. Chihuahua (1:384)
 8. Nayarit (1:386)
 9. Guanajuato (1:459)
 10. Baja California (1:478)
 11. Nuevo León (1:594)

People

Macías (troubadour), 14th-century Galician troubadour

A 
Adriana Castelán Macías (born 1983), Mexican politician
Alejandro Pérez Macías (born 1975), Mexican football manager
Alma Hilda Medina Macías (born 1976), Mexican politician
Amalia Macías, Mexican singer
Amanda Macias, American journalist
Anthony Macias (born 1971), American mixed martial artist
Antonio Macías del Real (1866–1939), Spanish writer
Ayumi Macías (born 1997), Mexican swimmer

B  
Bianca Jagger (née Pérez-Mora Macías, born 1945), Nicaraguan social and human rights advocate

C 
Carlos Fuentes Macías (1928–2012), Mexican writer 
Carlos Jiménez Macías (born 1950), Mexican politician
Carlos Manuel Urzúa Macías (born 1955), Mexican economist
Carlos Tello Macías (born 1938), Mexican economist
Carlos Macias Arellano (born 1931), Mexican politician

D 
Daniela Macías (born 1997), Peruvian badminton player
David Macias, American professional baseball coach
Drew Macias (born 1983), American former professional baseball outfielder
Dení Ramírez Macías (born 1978), Mexican biologist

E 
Elva Macias (born 1944), Mexican poet
Emilio Macias, Filipino politician (1933–2010)
Gaston Ghrenassia (born 1938), known as Enrico Macias, Algerian-French singer

F 
Francisco Macías Nguema (1924–1979), 1st president of Equatorial Guinea
Francisco Macías Valadéz, former international commissioner of the Asociación de Scouts de México, Asociación Civil
Gonzalo Macías (c. 1509–?), Spanish conquistador

G 
Guillermo Álvarez Macías (1919–1976), Mexican businessman

I 
Isabel Macías, Spanish athlete
Ivana Baquero Macías (born 1994), Spanish actress

J 
Javier Guízar Macías (born 1964), Mexican politician
Jesús Gónzález Macías (born 1972), Mexican politician
Jorge Macías (born 1984), Mexican football manage
José Macías (born 1972), Panamanian retired utility man
José Juan Macías (born 1999), Mexican professional footballer
José Natividad Macías (1857–1948), Mexican attorney
José Ulises Macías Salcedo (born 1940), Mexican Roman Catholic archbishop
Saint Juan Macias (1585–1645), 17th-century Spanish Dominican, died in Peru
Juan Carlos Macías (born 1945), Argentine filmmaker
Juan José Serrano Macías (born 1981), commonly known as Juanjo, Spanish former footballer
Evelina Orellana (1908–1986), commonly known as Julia Evelina Macías Lopera, Ecuadorian actress
Julio Macias (born 1990), Mexican actor

L 
Leandro Macías (born 1990), Cuban male volleyball player
Lucas Macías Navarro (born 1978), Spanish oboist
Luciano Macías (born 1935), Ecuadorian former soccer player
Luis Macias (born 1985), Ecuadorian football forward
Luis Fernando Macías (born 1982), Mexican former professional cyclist
Luis Antonio Macías Lozano (born 1972), Mexican former professional football defender

M 
Manuel Macías y Casado (1844–1937), governor of Puerto Rico
Marcelo Macías (born 1975), Uruguayan football goalkeeper
Marco Macías (born 1985), Mexican male volleyball player
Mario Antonio Macias (born 1985), Mexican professional boxer
Marisol Macías (c. 1972–2011), Mexican newspaper editor

N 
Napoleón Macías (?–1979), Salvadoran Roman Catholic pries

O 
Oscar Macías (disambiguation), multiple people

P 
Patrick Macias (born 1972), American author
Pere Macias (born 1956), Spanish politician

R 
Raquel del Rosario Macías (born 1982), Spanish singer
Raúl Macías (1934–2009), Mexican professional boxer
Raúl Macías Sandoval (born 1942), Mexican politician
Ray Macias (born 1986), American former professional ice hockey defenseman
Ricardo Macías Picavea (1847–1899), Spanish writer, journalist, and philosopher
Rómulo Salazar Macías (born 1951), Mexican politician
María del Rosario Green Macías (1941–2017), Mexican politician

S 
Sofía Macias (born 1984), Mexican entrepreneur

T 
Teodoro Macias, American perpetrator of the 2021 Colorado Springs shooting
Tommy Macias (born 1993), Swedish judoka
Trinidad Macías (born 1942), Mexican volleyball player

U 
Uriel Macias (born 1994), American soccer player

V 
Víctor Macías, Ecuadorian footballer

W 
Wilson Macías (born 1965), Ecuadorian footballer

X 
Xabier Macias Virgós (born 1958), Spanish psychologist

See also 
Macia (name), variant of Macías

References 

Surnames
Spanish-language surnames